Adolfus jacksoni, also known as Jackson's forest lizard, is a species of lizard found in Kenya, Uganda, Rwanda, Burundi, Tanzania, and eastern Democratic Republic of the Congo. It is named after Frederick John Jackson, English colonial administrator and ornithologist.

References

Adolfus
Lacertid lizards of Africa
Reptiles of the Democratic Republic of the Congo
Reptiles of Kenya
Reptiles of Tanzania
Reptiles of Uganda
Vertebrates of Burundi
Vertebrates of Rwanda
Reptiles described in 1899
Taxa named by George Albert Boulenger